Stella Getz (born 10 October 1976) is a Norwegian singer. Born in Nigeria, she grew up in Trondheim. Her single, the Eurodance song "Friends" from 1993 became a big hit in Norway and other countries in Europe. The music video was often shown on MTV and she became popular especially in Germany. There, she toured with other artists such as Dr. Alban and 2 Unlimited. Her other singles were "Dr. Love", "Yeah Yeah", "All in All", and "Ta-di-di-boom". In 1994, her debut album, Forbidden Dreams was released. In 1995, Getz was engaged to the Norwegian popstar Espen Lind.

References

External links
stellagetz.no Stella Getz website 
Stella Getz on The Eurodance Encyclopaedia

1976 births
Living people
Nigerian emigrants to Norway
Musicians from Trondheim
Norwegian pop singers
English-language singers from Norway
Eurodance musicians
21st-century Norwegian singers
21st-century Norwegian women singers